Jenny L. Davis is an American linguist, anthropologist, and poet. She is an Associate Professor of Anthropology, American Indian Studies, and Gender & Women's Studies at the University of Illinois at Urbana–Champaign where she is the director of the American Indian Studies Program. Her research is on contemporary Indigenous languages and identity, focusing on Indigenous language revitalization and Indigenous gender and sexuality, especially within the Two-Spirit movement.

She is an author of non-fiction, fiction, and poetry  from Mannford, Oklahoma and a citizen of the Chickasaw Nation. Her books have been awarded the Ruth Benedict Prize by the Association for Queer Anthropology for her co-edited volume, Queer Excursions: Retheorizing Binaries in Language, Gender, and Sexuality. and the Beatrice Medicine Award for Best Monograph in American Indian Studies from the Native American Literature Symposium and the Association for the Study of American Indian Literatures for her book, Talking Indian: Identity and Language Revitalization in the Chickasaw Renaissance.

Education
Davis studied Spanish and English at Oklahoma State University and holds an MA and PhD in Linguistics from the University of Colorado Boulder. She has held the Henry Roe Cloud Fellowship at Yale University and the Lyman T. Johnson Postdoctoral Fellowship at the University of Kentucky.

Activism
Davis's activism is split between advocating for Indigenous and endangered language revitalization and the Two-Spirit movement. She served as a co-director of both the Two-Spirit Society of Denver (2007–2010) and the Tulsa Two-Spirit Society (2010–2011) and co-organizer of the 2009 International Two Spirit Gathering in Estes Park, Colorado. In 2014, she served as one of three head dancers at the Bay Area American Indian Two Spirit Society (BAAITS) Powwow.

Davis teaches workshops and courses around language documentation and revitalization and has been involved with the InField/CoLANG Institute as a co-instructor of the Language Activism course at the 2014, 2016, and 2018 summer institutes.

Published works

Books

Honors and awards
2021 Dynamic Woman of the Chickasaw Nation Award, which annually recognizes a Chickasaw woman who has made great accomplishments in her career field and contributed towards the preservation and perpetuation of Chickasaw culture.
2019 Beatrice Medicine Award for Best Monograph in American Indian Studies for Talking Indian: Identity and Language Revitalization in the Chickasaw Renaissance from the Native American Literature Symposium and the Association for the Study of American Indian Literatures.
2014 Ruth Benedict Prize for Queer Excursions: Retheorizing Binaries in Language, Gender, and Sexuality from the Association for Queer Anthropology and the American Anthropological Association.

Professional fellowships
2020-2021 Helen Corley Petit Scholar, University of Illinois, Urbana-Champaign 
2019-2023 Chancellor's Fellow of Indigenous Research and Ethics, University of Illinois, Urbana-Champaign
2013-2014 Lyman T. Johnson Postdoctoral Fellow, Dept. of Linguistics, University of Kentucky.
2011-2012 Henry Roe Cloud Dissertation Writing Fellow in American Indian Studies, Yale University.

Interviews and research coverage

References

Year of birth missing (living people)
Living people
21st-century American poets
21st-century American non-fiction writers
21st-century American women writers
21st-century linguists
21st-century Native Americans
American anthropologists
American women anthropologists
American women non-fiction writers
American women poets
American women social scientists
Chickasaw people
Linguists from the United States
Native American academics
Native American linguists
Native American women academics
American women academics
Native American women writers
Native American writers
People from Creek County, Oklahoma
Poets from Oklahoma
University of Colorado Boulder alumni
University of Illinois Urbana-Champaign faculty
Women linguists
21st-century Native American women